Ruth O. Ojadi is a British singer-songwriter who appeared in BBC's documentary, Tourettes: I Swear I Can Sing. She attended Middlesex University in 2006 but dropped out after two years due to her Tourette syndrome. She also appeared in the Channel 4 show The Undateables and is bisexual.

Early life
She was born in Crouch End, North London, to Nigerian parents. Her father went back to Nigeria when she was two.

References

External links 

 BBC iPlayer – Tourettes: I Swear I Can Sing

Living people
1986 births
Alumni of Middlesex University
Bisexual women
British television documentaries
Documentary films about mental health
English people of Nigerian descent
LGBT Black British people
English LGBT singers
People from Crouch End
People with Tourette syndrome